Seyyed Morteza (also Romanized as Seyyed Morteẕá and Seyyed Mortazā; also known as Deh-e Seyyed Morteẕá, Deh-e Seyyed Mortezá, and Saiyid Murtaza) is a village in Hanza Rural District, Hanza District, Rabor County, Kerman Province, Iran. At the 2006 census, its population was 73, in 17 families.

References 

Populated places in Rabor County